The twenty-first season of the reality show singing competition American Idol premiered on February 19, 2023, on the ABC television network. It is the sixth season to air on ABC since the series' revival. Ryan Seacrest returned as host, and Katy Perry, Luke Bryan and Lionel Richie returned as judges.

Auditions 
The Idol Across America virtual auditions program returned from the previous two seasons. The remote auditions took place from August 3 to September 14, 2022, as well as a number of open-call auditions, and from these, the producers selected the contestants who can then audition in front of the judges.

The "platinum ticket" returned from last season. During the audition round, a total of three platinum tickets are awarded, giving the recipients the opportunity to advance directly to the second round of Hollywood Week and pick their partners for that week's Duet Challenge, before the remaining contestants are paired. The platinum ticket recipients are Tyson Venegas, and Kaylin Hedges.

Ratings

References

External links 
 

2023 American television seasons
American Idol seasons